Myennis nebulosa is a species of ulidiid or picture-winged fly in the genus Myennis of the family Ulidiidae.

Distribution
Turkmenistan.

References

Otitinae
Insects described in 1997
Diptera of Asia
Endemic fauna of Turkmenistan